The Persian Empire, including modern Lebanon, eventually fell to Alexander the Great, king of Macedonia. He attacked Asia Minor, defeated the Persian troops in 333 BC, and advanced toward the Lebanese coast. Initially the Phoenician cities made no attempt to resist, and they recognized his suzerainty. However, when Alexander tried to offer a sacrifice to Melqart, Tyre's god, the city resisted. Alexander besieged Tyre in retaliation in early 332 BC. After seven months of resistance, the city fell, and its people were sold into slavery (See Siege of Tyre (332 BC)). Despite his early death in 323 BC, Alexander's conquest of the eastern Mediterranean Basin left a Greek imprint on the area. The Phoenicians, being a cosmopolitan people amenable to outside influences, adopted aspects of Greek civilization with ease.

The Seleucid Dynasty
After Alexander's death, his empire was divided among his Macedonian generals. The eastern part—Phoenicia, Asia Minor, northern Syria, and Mesopotamia fell to Seleucus I, founder of the Seleucid dynasty. The southern part of Syria and Egypt fell to Ptolemy I Soter, and the European part, including Macedonia, to Antigonus I. This settlement, however, failed to bring peace because Seleucus I and Ptolemy clashed repeatedly in the course of their ambitious efforts to share in Phoenician prosperity. A final victory of the Seleucids ended a forty-year period of conflict. 

The last century of Seleucid rule was marked by disorder and dynastic struggles. These ended in 64 BC, when the Roman general Pompey added Syria and Lebanon to the Roman Empire.

Hellenistic writers from Seleucid and Roman Phoenicia
Antipater of Sidon, poet
Boethus of Sidon, Stoic philosopher
Zeno of Sidon, philosopher
Boethus of Sidon, philosopher
Dorotheus of Sidon, astrologer
Meges of Sidon, physician
Porphyry of Tyre, philosopher
Maximus of Tyre, rhetorician
Marinus of Tyre, geographer

References

This article is based on public-domain text from the Lebanon Country Study (1987) of the Library of Congress Country Studies project; specifically from Chapter 1: Historical Setting, by Afaf Sabeh McGowen.

History of Phoenicia
Ancient Lebanon
Seleucid Empire